Vladas Šigauskas (born 7 August 1967) is a professional archer who internationally represents Lithuania. He was announced as the best Lithuanian archer of 2010 in recurve events.

In 2011 Šigauskas won a bronze medal at the European Grand Prix in Antalya, Turkey.

References 

1967 births
Living people
Lithuanian male archers